The 1908 Major League Baseball season was contested from April 14 to October 14, 1908. The Chicago Cubs and Detroit Tigers were the regular season champions of the National League and American League, respectively. In a rematch of the prior year's postseason, the Cubs then defeated the Tigers in the World Series, four games to one.

Statistical leaders

Standings

American League

National League

Postseason

Bracket

Events
June 30 – Cy Young pitches the third, and final, no-hitter of his career as the Boston Red Sox defeat the New York Highlanders, 8–0.
July 4 – One batter away from a perfect game, New York Giants pitcher Hooks Wiltse hits George McQuillan with two outs in the ninth inning. Wiltse continues to pitch and tosses a no-hitter against the Philadelphia Phillies. The Giants win, 1–0, in 10 innings.
August 4 – In a game between the St. Louis Cardinals and the Brooklyn Superbas only one baseball was used for the entire game. Brooklyn wins, 3–0.
September 5 – Nap Rucker pitches a no-hitter as the Brooklyn Superbas defeat the Boston Doves, 6–0.
September 18 – Cleveland Naps pitcher Bob Rhoads tosses a no-hitter against the Boston Red Sox, Cleveland wins, 2–1.
September 20 – Frank Smith of the Chicago White Sox throws a no-hitter against the Philadelphia Athletics, the White Sox win, 1–0. It is the second no-hitter of Smith's career.
September 23 – The Chicago Cubs and New York Giants, involved in a tight pennant race, (also involving the Pittsburgh Pirates) were tied in the bottom of the ninth inning at the Polo Grounds in New York. The Giants had runners on first and third and two outs when Al Bridwell hit a single to center field, scoring Moose McCormick from third with the Giants' apparent winning run, but the runner on first base, rookie Fred Merkle, thinking the game was over, went half way to second and then sprinted to the clubhouse after McCormick touched home plate. As fans swarmed the field, Cub infielder Johnny Evers retrieved the ball and touched second. A forceout was called at second base, nullifying the single, and because there were 2 outs when the play started, the run was also nullified and the inning ended. The game was declared a tie and would be made up at the end of the season if the Cubs and Giants were tied for first place. The incident became known as the "Merkle Boner".
September 26 – Ed Reulbach of the Chicago Cubs pitches two shutouts in a doubleheader against the Brooklyn Dodgers, winning both games 5–0 and 3–0.
October 2 – In a game involving the Cleveland Naps and the Chicago White Sox, Ed Walsh struck out 15 Naps and walked one batter, pitching a complete game, but it was not enough as Addie Joss pitched a perfect game, and the Naps beat the White Sox, 1–0, during the heat of a pennant race. Cleveland center fielder Joe Birmingham scored the game's only run. It is perhaps the finest pitching duel in baseball history.
October 6 – The Detroit Tigers defeat the Chicago White Sox, 7–0, to win the American League pennant on the last day of the season.
October 8 – The Chicago Cubs defeat the New York Giants, 4–2, in the make-up of the "Merkle Boner" game, giving the Cubs the National League pennant.
October 14 – The Chicago Cubs defeat the Detroit Tigers, 2–0, in Game 5 of the World Series to win the series four games to one. It is the second consecutive World Championship for the Cubs and the second year in a row they defeated the Tigers in the World Series. The Cubs would not win another World Series until 2016.
The St. Louis Cardinals set a Major League record which stills stands for the fewest runs scored in a season, with only 372.

Managers

American League

National League

References

Bibliography
Anderson, David W. (2000). More Than Merkle: A History of the Best and Most Exciting Baseball Season in Human History. Lincoln, Nebraska: University of Nebraska Press. .
Fleming, G.H. (1981). The Unforgettable Season: The Most Exciting & Calamitous Pennant Race of All Time. New York: Holt, Rinehart & Winston. .
Murphy, Cait. (2007). Crazy '08: How a Cast of Cranks, Rogues, Boneheads, and Magnates Created the Greatest Year in Baseball History. New York: HarperCollins/Smithsonian Books. .

External links
1908 Major League Baseball season schedule at Baseball Reference
1908 in baseball history from ThisGreatGame.com

 
Major League Baseball seasons